Eric Norin (born October 22, 1991) is a Swedish professional ice hockey player, currently playing with AIK in the HockeyAllsvenskan (Allsv). He played with AIK IF in the Elitserien during the 2010–11 Elitserien season and has also appeared in the top flight for Brynäs IF.

Playing career
Norin began playing ice hockey in IFK Täby, in northern Stockholm. He then moved to Stocksund IF's under-18 team, he played one season for Stocksund J18 during the 2007–08 season. The season 2008–09 he moved to AIK J18. This season the team became J18 Allsvenskan Champions by defeating Skellefteå AIK in the finals. The team became AIK's first J18 team ever to win the Championship in AIK history. Norin also had a successful season 2010–11 in AIK J20 SuperElit, scoring 10 goals and 27 points in 39 games, as well as 2 points in 5 games in the Elitserien.

References

External links

1991 births
AIK IF players
Almtuna IS players
Brynäs IF players
Living people
Swedish ice hockey defencemen
People from Täby Municipality
Sportspeople from Stockholm County
Tappara players
HC Vita Hästen players